The Picnic may refer to:

 The Picnic (1930 film), a Mickey Mouse cartoon
 The Picnic (1976 film), a Two Ronnies television film
 The Picnic, a 2012 short silent film
 The Picnic (novel), a 1937 novel by Martin Boyd
 The Picnic (Tissot) or Holyday, an 1876 painting by James Tissot
 "The Picnic" (Wander Over Yonder), a television episode

See also
 Picnic (disambiguation)